John Brown Stone Warehouse, also known as The Canal House, is a historic commercial building located in downtown Fort Wayne, Indiana. It was built in 1852, and is a two-story, three bay, gable front stone building.  The building measures 22 feet wide and 50 feet deep.  It was built by John Brown out of salvage and "waste" materials from his business as stone merchant and mason.  It is the oldest commercial building in Fort Wayne and has been renovated to house offices.

It was listed on the National Register of Historic Places in 1997.

References

Commercial buildings on the National Register of Historic Places in Indiana
Commercial buildings completed in 1852
Buildings and structures in Fort Wayne, Indiana
National Register of Historic Places in Fort Wayne, Indiana
1852 establishments in Indiana